Elermore Vale is a suburb on the western outskirts of Newcastle, New South Wales.  Before becoming a residential suburb in the 1900s, the area was used for chicken farming, cattle farming, and coal mining.  By the 1960s, the school and the other facilities of the suburb had been established.

Previously known as Wallsend South before being renamed Elermore Vale. Elermore Vale had a population of around 5,500 in 2016. Elermore Vale is very well located within the Newcastle region, with the beaches being 10km in a straight line, and access to the F3 Freeway being within 10 minutes also. It is close to several major shopping centers, being Stockland Glendale and Westfield Kotara. Housing is generally a mix of single dwelling or townhouses, with an increasing number of knock-down rebuilds occurring.

Plans for development of a retirement village, a A$6 million project by developers Pepperwood Ridge to create 72 self-care units for 800 people, in Elermore Vale have caused controversy. In 2004 Newcastle City Council defended an appeal made by the developers in the New South Wales Land and Environment Court.

The suburb is served by Newcastle Transport bus routes 26 and 46 and Hunter Valley Buses routes 263 and 270.

There are 2 public schools within Elermore Vale. Elermore Vale Public School and Wallsend South public school. 

The Elermore Hotel was the starting and finishing point for the annual Shaft Shuffle Fun Run, organized by the Elermore Vale Lions.

In 2016 the median age of resident was 40, 81.5% were born in Australia and 84.9% only spoke English at home.

References

Further reading 
  – a report on the Elermore Vale Shopping Centre

External links
 

Suburbs of Newcastle, New South Wales